Jennifer Chen or Chen Chun-chen is a professional pool player.

Titles
 1991 China Pool Championship
 1993 Taiwan Cup
 1993 All Japan Championship 9-Ball
 1997 All Japan Championship 9-Ball
 1997 All Japan Championship
 1999 Spanish Cup
 2000 WPA Amway Cup 9-Ball World Open
 2003 Asian Cup (Shanghai)
 2003 Asian Cup (Changsha)

External links
 WPBA profile

Taiwanese pool players
Living people
Female pool players
1975 births
People from Luodong, Yilan County, Taiwan
World Games silver medalists
World Games bronze medalists
Competitors at the 2001 World Games
Competitors at the 2005 World Games